Byomkesh Gotro is a Bengali detective thriller film directed by Arindam Sil and based on a Byomkesh Bakshi story Rakter Daag by Sharadindu Bandyopadhyay. This film is produced by Shrikant Mohta and Mahendra Soni under the banner of Shree Venkatesh Films and it was released in 12 October 2018.

Plot
Satyakam, a young boy comes to Byomkesh in Kolkata and introduces himself as son of a business magnate from Mussourie. He confesses that he is a womaniser by nature. He invites Byomkesh to come to Mussoorie because he feels that his life is under threat. When Byomkesh reaches Mussoorie, finds that Satyakam was murdered mysteriously. Boymkesh starts investigation which reveals a dark history of Satyakam's family.

Cast
 Abir Chatterjee as Byomkesh Bakshi
 Sohini Sarkar as Satyabati
 Rahul Banerjee as Ajit
 Anjan Dutt as Ushapati Das
 Arjun Chakraborty as Satyakam Das
 Priyanka Sarkar as Emily
 Harsh Chhaya as DSP Purandhar Pandey
 Anindita Bose
 Sauraseni Maitra as Chumki
 Bibriti Chatterjee as Meera
 Arindam Sil as (Cameo)
 Indrasish Roy as (Cameo)
 Baisakhi Marjit as Suchitra, Satyakam's mother
 Joydip Kundu
 Surendra Bhandari as mahadev

References

External links
 

2018 films
Bengali-language Indian films
2010s Bengali-language films
2018 crime thriller films
Indian crime thriller films
Films scored by Bickram Ghosh
Indian detective films
Byomkesh Bakshi films
Films set in Uttarakhand
Films based on works by Saradindu Bandopadhyay